"Sandía" is "watermelon" in Spanish. Sandia may also refer to:

Places
 Sandia, California, community in Imperial County
 Sandia, Texas, town in the USA
 Sandia, Peru, town in the Puno region of Peru, capital of
 Sandia Province, province in the Puno region
 Sandia Mountains, a mountain range near Albuquerque in New Mexico, USA, which gave their name to
 Sandia Heights, New Mexico
 Pueblo of Sandia Village, New Mexico, U.S. census-designated location
 Sandia Mountain Wilderness, in New Mexico, USA
 Sandia High School, high school in Albuquerque, New Mexico
 Sandia Motorsport Park, racing venue in Albuquerque, New Mexico
 Sandia Preparatory School, in Albuquerque, New Mexico
 Sandia View Academy, in Corrales, New Mexico
 Sandia Base, nuclear weapons base
 Sandia National Laboratories, a major United States Department of Energy research and development national laboratory
 Sandia Corporation, a wholly owned subsidiary of Lockheed Martin Corporation, which formerly managed and operated the Sandia National Laboratories
 Sandia Peak Tramway, tram way in New Mexico
 Sandia Pueblo, a Native American tribe
 Sandia Casino

Other
 Sandia (butterfly) Ehrlich & Clench 1960, a genus of butterflies
 Invalid genus names preoccupied by the butterflies:
 Sandia Sutherland & Harlow 1973, brachiopods
 Sandia Theron 1982, Hemiptera (true bugs)
 Sandia Furtado, Indian actress
 Sandia hairstreak (Callophrys mcfarlandi), species of butterfly